LG G2 Mini is an Android smartphone developed by LG Electronics. It was unveiled at a Mobile World Congress on February 23, 2014. The G2 Mini is designed as a smaller version of its full-sized namesake, sharing a similar design but with a smaller display and other lower-end hardware specifications. It lacks a status LED and an ambient light sensor.

See also
LG G2
LG Optimus G
LG Optimus G Pro
Nexus 5
List of Android devices

References

Android (operating system) devices
LG Electronics smartphones
Mobile phones introduced in 2013
Discontinued smartphones
Mobile phones with infrared transmitter